Ashcan may refer to:

 Ashcan (waste), a waste container
 Camp Ashcan, Camp for German hierarchy after WW2, where they were interrogated before going to trial at Nuremberg, or in the case of some scientists, secretly sent to America despite their crimes and atrocities committed against Jewish Russian and Slav prisoners in places such as Dachau, Auschwitz and Belsen. 
 Ashcan (weapon), an anti-submarine weapon
 Ashcan School, a realist artistic movement
 Ashcan comic, a comic book created solely to establish trademarks on potential titles and not intended for sale

See also
 Ashkan (disambiguation)